Ivan Srebrenjak or Srebrnjak (1903 – 21 May 1942) ran a Soviet intelligence network for the NKVD in the Balkans at the beginning of Axis occupation of Yugoslavia.

Srebrenjak was born in 1903 in Austro-Hungarian region of Slavonia that became part of Yugoslavia in 1918. Srebrenjak became a member Yugoslav Communist Party since 1928. After he killed a Yugoslav policeman in 1930 he left Yugoslavia and became a member of a group of Stalin's killers known as "liquidators" headed by Josip Broz Tito. When Axis forces occupied Yugoslavia in 1941 Srebrenjak returned to Yugoslavia and set up an NKVD centre in Zagreb, a part of Red Orchestra network. Tito considered him as an enemy and requested approval from Stalin to relieve Srebrenjak of that position, which was refused by Stalin. Subsequently, Srebrenjak was denounced to the Gestapo and Ustaše and he was captured. In captivity Srebrenjak was the first person to identify Tito as leader of Communist resistance movement in Yugoslavia to German and Ustaše authorities. To minimize further damage to his position Tito ordered to Stevo Krajačić to organize the murder of Srebrenjak and on 21 May 1942 Srebrenjak was killed in Ustaše prison. This murder allowed Tito to seize and stabilize his position of leader of the Communist Party of Yugoslavia.

Early life
Srebrenjak was born in 1903 in village Oprisavci near Slavonski Brod in Austria-Hungary (modern day Croatia). In 1928 he became a member of the Communist Party of Yugoslavia and in 1930 he murdered a police agent in Zagreb based on the order of the communist party. Because of this murder he had to leave Yugoslavia. 

In the Soviet Union Srebrenjak became a Soviet citizen with name Petar Petrovič Antonov who was considered as one of the most capable intelligence officers.

Initially, there were four centres of NKVD in Zagreb, parts of Red Orchestra, one operated by Andrija Hebrang, a second by Stevan Krajačić, a third by Josip Kopinič and a fourth by Ivan Srebrenjak.

In France
After leaving Yugoslavia Srebrenjak first went to Paris in France and joined a group of Stalin's killers known as "liquidators" headed by Josip Broz Tito, whose members were also Vittorio Vidali, Vlajko Begović and Ivan (Stevo) Krajačić. In Paris Srebrenjak killed Yugoslav agent Ilija Šumanovac.

During World War II
When Axis forces attacked Kingdom of Yugoslavia in April 1941, Srebrenjak came from France to Zagreb to run an "information point" for Soviet intelligence in Zagreb. In Zagreb Srebrenjak became a head of Soviet intelligence network of the NKVD for the Balkans. Srebrenjak operated from this centre in Zagreb together with his wife Frančiška Srebrenjak (nee Klinc), who was a secret agent of the Yugoslav police and later Gestapo. According to some sources she had a love affair with Stjepan Đaković, the elder son of Đuro Đaković.

Srebrenjak was the first victim of Tito's ambitions to become Stalin's intelligence officer not only for Yugoslavia but also for other Balkan countries as well. In a telegram sent to Tito on 1 July 1941, Kopinič asserted that Popović, Končar and Srebrenjak are enemy spies. Srebrenjak believed that some of Tito's close associates, like Ivo Lola Ribar and Boris Kidrič were in service of the Yugoslav regime

At the beginning of August 1941 Tito sent a telegram to Komintern insisting that Srebrenjak transfer all of his men to Communist Party of Yugoslavia control for training them as diversants because he did not organize this training himself and members of the party lost confidence in him.

Tito hated Srebrenjak because he reported to Stalin about Tito's struggle for leadership of the Communist Party of Yugoslavia. He requested from Stalin to relieve Srebrenjak from his post accusing him of being a Gestapo collaborator, but this attempt of Tito failed thanks to Srebrenjak's powerful Soviet patrons.

Ustaše and Gestapo were already informed about activities of Srebrenjak by Slavko Đukić who was an associate of Srebrenjak, but it was Joco Đaković who was younger son of Đuro Đaković and who was arrested in December 1941 and identified Srebrenjak to Ustaše.

In February 1942 Srebrenjak was arrested by Ustaše and tortured until he revealed names of Soviet agents in Croatia, Greece, Bulgaria and Italy. This was major success for Ustaše while Axis forces arrested ten to fifteen people based on the Srebrenjaks testimony, including Andrija Hebrang. Srebrenjak and Hebrang were the first people who identified leader of Communist Partisan forces to Ustaše and Axis special police as Josip Broz Tito, though Srebrenjak gave his name as Josip Brozović. Tito sent Krajačić to kill Srebrenjak.

According to Cenčić, Srebrenjaks wife Franciška was released from Ustaše prison under suspicious circumstances, Hebrang was exchanged while Srebrenjak was killed in Ustaše prison against order of Josip Broz Tito.

References

Sources 

 
 
 
 
 
 
 
 
 
 
 

1903 births
1942 deaths
Soviet spies
Executed spies
Comintern people
Red Orchestra (espionage)